Sesuvium verrucosum is a species of flowering plant in the family Aizoaceae known by the common names western sea-purslane and verrucose sea-purslane.

The gray-green herbage is verrucose, covered densely in crystalline bumps. They have no petals, but the five, pointed sepals are generally bright pink to reddish or orange in color with a thick, verrucose outer surface. At the centre of the flower is a ring of stamens around the central ovary.

It is native to the Americas, where it can be found in the southwestern United States plus Kansas and Missouri, Mexico, and parts of South America. It grows in many types of saline and alkaline habitat types on the coast and inland, including salt marshes and other saline wetlands, alkali flats, and drying desert washes.

References

External links

Jepson Manual Treatment
Photo gallery

verrucosum
Taxa named by Constantine Samuel Rafinesque